The 372nd Military Police Company is a law enforcement unit within the U.S. Army Reserve. The unit is based out of Cresaptown, Maryland. Eleven former members of this unit were charged and found guilty in the Abu Ghraib scandal. Another member of the company, Joseph Darby, was awarded the John F. Kennedy Profile in Courage Award for exposing the abuse at the prison.

The 372nd MP Company is credited with the securing and stabilization of the city of Hillah (Babylon), alongside of the 1st Marines (MEF).

The unit was responsible for guarding main supply routes (MSRs).

Unit history

The 372nd Military Police Company was originally activated on 15 October 1942 in Florence, Arizona under the authority of the Ninth Service Command. The unit was given orders in mid-July 1943 to report to Camp Shanks, near Orangeburg, New York for shipment to Italy in support of the Naples-Foggia Campaign. The unit also supported the Fifth Army in the Rome-Arno Campaign that began on 22 January 1944 and ended 4 June 1944. The unit has participated in Operation Dragoon in France, Operation Nordwind. The unit was deactivated on 14 November 1945 and then reactivated in Baltimore, Maryland on 26 June 1947. The unit was then relocated to Cumberland, Maryland on South Centre Street. The unit was then deactivated on 15 June 1959. The unit was then re designated Bravo Company of the 336th Military Police Battalion. In January 1964 members of the unit provided site security and acted as guides to the area for the B-52 which crashed in Garrett County. The Unit was then reactivated on 22 February 1972 once again as the 372nd Military Police Company as part of the First Army. The unit drilled at the VFW Hall in Lonaconing, Maryland. On 30 June 1973 the unit shifted its location to Cresaptown, Maryland, where it shared the reserve center with the 265th Ordnance Company. In the mid-1970s the unit recruited its first female military police officer. In 1985 a platoon size element was selected for duty in Operation Bright Star in Egypt and Jordan. In 1986 the entire company was selected to participate in Gallant Eagle in California. Then unit was then activated again on 25 September 1990 for Operation Desert Storm.

During the Iraq War, several detainees at Abu Ghraib prison were abused and humiliated, some of them quite a few times. Charles Graner, Lynndie England, Sabrina Harman and others were later investigated and made to serve time in a military prison.

Lineage

Constituted 25 September 1942 in the Army of the United States as the 372d Military Police Escort Guard Company
Activated 15 October 1942 at Florence, Arizona
Inactivated 14 November 1945 at Camp Myles Standish, Massachusetts
Allotted 14 June 1947 to the Organized Reserves
Activated 26 June 1947 at Baltimore, Maryland
(Organized Reserves redesignated 25 March 1948 as the Organized Reserve Corps)
(Organized Reserve Corps redesignated 9 July 1952 as the Army Reserve)
Location Changed 17 March 1949 to Cumberland, Maryland
Changed 20 August 1951 to Lonaconing, Maryland
Reorganized and redesignated 15 November 1952 as the 372d Military Police Company
Inactivated 15 June 1959 at Lonaconing, Maryland
Activated 22 February 1972 at Lonaconing, Maryland
Location changed 30 June 1973 Cumberland, Maryland
Ordered into active military service 27 September 1990 at Cumberland, Maryland
Released from active military service 24 May 1991 and reverted to reserve status
Ordered into active military service and deployed to Bosnia in support of Operation Noble Eagle in 2001–2002
Ordered into active military service 24 February 2003 at Cumberland, Maryland
Released from active military service 10 October 2004 and reverted to reserve status
Order into active military service 26 April 2010 at Cumberland, Maryland
Released from active military service 1 May 2011 and reverted to reserve status
Ordered into active military service 3 March 2016 at Cumberland, Maryland

Honors

Campaign participation credit
World War II – EAME:
Naples-Foggia;
Rome-Arno;
Southern France (with arrowhead);
Rhineland;
Ardennes-Alsace;
Central Europe
Southwest Asia:
Defense of Saudi Arabia;
Liberation of Kuwait;
Cease-Fire
Operation Noble Eagle 2001–2002
Operation Enduring Freedom 2001–2003
Operation Iraqi Freedom 2003–2004
Operation Enduring Freedom 2010–2011
Operation Enduring Freedom 2016–2017

Unit Awards

Decorations
None

See also
Abu Ghraib torture and prisoner abuse
Charles Graner
Ivan Frederick
Jeremy Sivits
Joe Darby
Lynndie England
Megan Ambuhl
Sabrina Harman
Standard Operating Procedure

Notes

External links
Lineage info

0372